This is a list of events from the year 2019 in North Macedonia.

Incumbents
 President: Gjorge Ivanov (until 12 May); Stevo Pendarovski (from 12 May)
 Prime Minister: Zoran Zaev

Events

12 February – The official name of the country is changed to "Republic of North Macedonia", or North Macedonia for short (formerly the Republic of Macedonia and commonly known as Macedonia).
21 April – Presidential Election.
12 May – President Stevo Pendarovski is inaugurated.

Sport
The 2018–19 Macedonian Football Cup continues from 2018.

Deaths

9 January – Milan Pančevski, politician, Chairman of the Presidium of the League of Communists of Yugoslavia (b. 1935).

References

 
North Macedonia
North Macedonia